The X-Ecutioners are a group of American hip hop DJs/turntablists from New York City, New York. The group formed in 1989 and currently consists of three DJs, including Total Eclipse, DJ Boogie Blind, and DJ Precision. Original members of the group included Mista Sinista, Rob Swift, and Roc Raida (who died in September 2009).

Rob Swift and Total Eclipse formed a side project called Ill Insanity releasing one album together in 2008 entitled Ground Xero.

History
the X-Ecutioners formed as a DJ crew in 1989 that originally included 11 members. The group's original name was the X-Men named after the Marvel Comics superhero team which was chosen partly because of their rivalry between DJ Clark Kent's crew of DJs, known as the Supermen, and after the DC Comics' Superman. They later changed their name for trademark reasons.

After the group's name changed, the crew was later reduced to members Rob Swift, Roc Raida, Total Eclipse, and Mista Sinista (named after the X-Men villain Mister Sinister) before releasing their debut studio album, X-Pressions in 1997. Sinista later left the group shortly after the release of their second studio album Built from Scratch in 2001.

the X-Ecutioners have worked with many famous artists on their albums Built from Scratch and Revolutions and are highly respected in hip hop for their turntable skills, being famous for the technique known as beat juggling. They have been known to do numerous collaborations, ranging from Kool G Rap to Cypress Hill, Mike Shinoda and Joe Hahn of rock band Linkin Park, and co-released a collaboration album with Mike Patton called General Patton vs. The X-Ecutioners. The X-Ecutioners contributed a remix of Run-DMC's "King of Rock" on the Harmonix game Amplitude, and the song "Like This" was featured in the video game SSX 3. Their Music and themselves were also featured in the game, NFL Street. As of 2007, Rob Swift, Total Eclipse and Precision have formed a new group called Ill Insanity. Their latest studio album release, Ground Xero contains 14 tracks featuring the likes of DJ QBert, DJ Excess, and Grand Master Roc Raida. Ill Insanity has posted a blog on their Myspace regarding a reunion tour in Australia in October 2008. The group commented in their blog

"Undeniably one of the greatest turntablist crews of all time, New York's legends The X-Ecutioners are reuniting exclusively to tour Australia for the very first time. The supremely talented turntablists, Grandmaster Roc Raida, Rob Swift, Boogie Blind, Total Eclipse and Precision have exclusively come together for this tour and across 10 turntables will leave you speechless with their unbelievable turntable skills of cutting, mixing, scratching and beat juggling."

The group announced at 2008 the tour dates on both the X-Ecutioners' and Ill Insanity's Myspace Reunion Tour Blog. In a recent interview with E.Zee Radio, Mista Sinista says (2008) that the "current X-Men are Mista Sinista, Total Eclipse, Boogie Blind, Steve D, Sean C, Johnny Cash, Diamond J, Exotic E and Roc Raida who will always be there."

Roc Raida died on September 19, 2009 from complications of a stroke from training in Krav Maga.

Total Eclipse is the last member from the original X-Men/X-Ecutioners who still plays for the X-Ecutioners

Personnel

Current members
 Total Eclipse - turntables (1996–present)
 DJ Boogie Blind - turntables (2004–present)
 DJ Precision - turntables (2004–present)

Former members
 Mista Sinista - turntables (1989–2001)
 Rob Swift - turntables (1989–2004)
 Roc Raida - turntables (1989–2009) (deceased)

Discography

Albums

Extended plays
 Música Negra (Black Music)/Wordplay (1997)

Compilation albums
 Japan X-Clusive (1997)
 Scratchology (2003)

Singles
  "It's Goin' Down" (2002)

References

External links
 The X-Ecutioners at Rolling Stone
 The X-Ecutioners at IGN Music

American hip hop groups
American hip hop DJs
Columbia Records artists